La Paz is a village in the Colonia Department of southwestern Uruguay.

Geography

History
This village was established in 1858 as a Waldensian colony.

Population
In 2011 La Paz had a population of 603.
 
Source: Instituto Nacional de Estadística de Uruguay

Places of worship
 Waldensian Evangelical Church (Waldensians)
 Holy Cross Chapel  (Roman Catholic)

References

External links
INE map of La Paz

Populated places in the Colonia Department